D. Devaraj Urs Ministry was the Council of Ministers in Mysore, a state in South India headed by D. Devaraj Urs of the Indian National Congress.

The ministry had multiple  ministers including the Chief Minister. All ministers belonged to the Indian National Congress.

D. Devaraj Urs became Chief minister of Mysore after Indian National Congress emerged victorious 1972 Mysore elections.

Chief Minister & Cabinet Ministers

Minister of State

See also 
 Mysore Legislative Assembly
 Mysore Legislative Council
 Politics of Mysore

References 

Cabinets established in 1972
1972 establishments in Mysore State
1977 disestablishments in India
Devaraj Urs
Indian National Congress state ministries
Cabinets disestablished in 1977
1972 in Indian politics